The Wirtembergisches Repertorium der Literatur (Württembergish Inventory of Literature) was a quarterly literary journal published by Friedrich Schiller and Johann Wilhelm Petersen in Ulm in 1782 and 1783.

References

Defunct literary magazines published in Germany
German-language magazines
Magazines established in 1782
Magazines disestablished in 1783
Mass media in Ulm
Quarterly magazines published in Germany
Works by Friedrich Schiller